Perfect Orange was a third-wave ska band from Knoxville, Tennessee. They formed in 2002 and disbanded in 2005.

The group never gained large national attention, although they did tour the nation three times playing small clubs and releasing independent albums. Toward the end of the band's life it began to move away from ska, and trumpet player Ben Altom described Perfect Orange as "an emo band with horns".  Altom was responsible for starting Ska Weekend, the largest ska festival in the country. It is an annual tradition, taking place in Knoxville each April (Though this recent years event took place in August, and might continue the same relative date.)

Band members
 Zac "Tater" Johnson - guitar, lead vocals
 "Big" Ben Altom - trumpet, backing vocals
 Travis "Gordo" Gordon - tenor saxophone
 Brett Smith - bass guitar
 Doug "32a" Griffey - drums
 Doug Brown - bass guitar
 Mike Agentis - bass
 Ryan Lambert - drums
 Doug "32a" Griffey - trombone
 Chase Campbell - saxophone

Discography
 Live at 228 (2002)
 Garage Demo (2003)
 PO Live (2003)
 Extra Pulp (2003)
 Extra Pulp Special Edition (2003)
 Live at CBGB (2004)
 To The Rescue (2004)
 This Is Only A Test (2004)

External links
 Perfect Orange's Official Website
 Perfect Orange on purevolume

Third-wave ska groups
American ska musical groups
2002 establishments in Tennessee
2005 disestablishments in Tennessee
Musical groups established in 2002
Musical groups disestablished in 2005
Musical groups from Knoxville, Tennessee